Nome is a city in the Nome Census Area in the Unorganized Borough of Alaska, United States. The city is located on the southern Seward Peninsula coast on Norton Sound of the Bering Sea. It had a population of 3,699 recorded in the 2020 census, up from 3,598 in 2010. Nome was incorporated on April 9, 1901, and was once the most-populous city in Alaska. Nome lies within the region of the Bering Straits Native Corporation, which is headquartered in Nome.

The city of Nome also claims to be home to the world's largest gold pan, although this claim has been disputed by the Canadian city of Quesnel, British Columbia.

In the winter of 1925, a diphtheria epidemic raged among Alaska Natives in the Nome area. Fierce territory-wide blizzard conditions prevented the delivery of a life-saving diphtheria antitoxin serum by airplane from Anchorage. A relay of dog sled teams was organized to deliver the serum. Today, the Iditarod Dog Sled Race follows the same route they took and ends in Nome.

Etymology

The origin of the city's name "Nome" is debated; there are three theories. The first is that the name was given by Nome's founder, Jafet Lindeberg, an immigrant from Norway. Nome appears as a toponym in several places in Norway.

A second theory is that Nome received its name through an error: allegedly when a British cartographer copied an ambiguous annotation made by a British officer on a nautical chart, while on a voyage up the Bering Strait. The officer had written "? Name" next to the unnamed cape. The mapmaker misread the annotation as "C. Nome", or Cape Nome, and used that name on his own chart; the city in turn took its name from the cape. Noted toponymist and historian George R. Stewart favored this explanation, citing a letter from the British Admiralty which allegedly confirmed the story from historical records.

The third proposed origin of the name is from a misunderstanding of the local Inupiaq word for "Where at?", Naami.

The United States Post Office in Nome refused to accept the change. Fearing a move of the post office to Nome City, a mining camp on the Nome River, the merchants unhappily agreed to change the name of Anvil City back to Nome.

Geography and climate

Nome is located at  (64.503889, −165.399444).

Nome has a subarctic climate (Köppen Dfc), with long, very cold winters, and short, cool summers. However, conditions in both winter and summer are moderated by the city's coastal location; winters are less severe than in the Interior, and conversely, summers are lukewarm. For example, Fairbanks at a similar parallel quite far inland has much greater temperature swings with both very warm and cold temperatures throughout the year. Even so, Nome is influenced by Far East Russia's cold landmass and as a result the climate is much colder than in coastal Scandinavia at similar latitudes.

Average highs stay below freezing from late October until late April, and the average first and last dates of freezing lows are August 30 and June 9, respectively, a freeze-free period of 81 days.

Demographics

Nome first appeared on the 1900 US Census as an unincorporated village of 12,488 residents. At the time, it was the largest community in Alaska, ahead of Skagway and Juneau, the 2nd and 3rd largest places. The demographics for 1900 included 12,395 Whites, 42 Natives, 41 Asians and 10 Blacks. It was incorporated as a city in 1901. By 1910, it had fallen to 2,600 residents. Of those, 2,311 were White, 235 were Natives and 54 for all other races. It dropped to the 2nd largest city in Alaska behind Fairbanks. By 1920, it dropped to 9th place, with just 852 residents.

In 1930, it rose to 6th largest with 1,213 residents (882 Whites, 326 Natives, 5 others). In 1940, it remained in 6th place with 1,559 residents. It dropped to 10th place in 1950 with 1,876 residents. In 1960, it rose to 8th place with 2,316 residents (with 1,608 "other", which was mostly Native; 705 Whites and 3 Blacks). By 1970, Nome had fallen out of the top 10 places to 18th largest community (although 9th largest incorporated city). In 1980, it was 15th largest (12th largest incorporated city). In 1990, it was 16th largest (12th largest incorporated city). In 2000, it was 25th largest (16th largest incorporated city). In 2010, it was now the 30th largest (16th largest incorporated city).

As of the 2000 United States Census, there were 3,505 people, 1,184 households, and 749 families in the city. The racial makeup of the city was 51.0% Native American, 37.9% White, 1.5% Asian, 0.9% Black or African American, 0.1% Pacific Islander, 0.4% from other races, and 8.2% from two or more races, Hispanic or Latino of any race were 2.2% of the population.

There were 1,184 households, out of which 38.9% had children under the age of 18 living with them, 41.7% were married couples living together, 12.3% had a female householder with no husband present, and 36.7% were non-families. 27.4% of all households were made up of individuals, and 3.7% had someone living alone who was 65 years of age or older. The average household size was 2.79 and the average family size was 3.45.

The city population contained 31.9% under the age of 18, 8.0% from 18 to 24, 32.1% from 25 to 44, 21.7% from 45 to 64, and 6.2% who were 65 years of age or older. The median age was 32 years. For every 100 females, there were 115.2 males. For every 100 females age 18 and over, there were 117.8 males.

The median income for a household in the city was $59,402, and the median income for a family was $68,804. Males had a median income of $50,521 versus $35,804 for females. The per capita income for the city was $23,402. About 5.4% of families and 6.3% of the population were below the poverty line, including 4.3% under the age of 18 and 6.9% ages 65 or older.

The population of Nome is a mixture of Inupiat Eskimos and non-Natives. Although some employment opportunities are available, subsistence activities are prevalent in the community. A federally recognized tribe is located in the community, the Nome Eskimo Community. Former villagers from King Island also live in Nome. The ANCSA village corporation in Nome is Sitnasuak Native Corporation.

History

Pre-history
Inupiat hunted for game on the west coast of Alaska from prehistoric times and there is recent archeological evidence to suggest that there was an Inupiat settlement at Nome, known in Inupiat as Sitnasuak, before the discovery of gold.

Gold rush

In the summer of 1898, the "Three Lucky Swedes": Norwegian-American Jafet Lindeberg, and two naturalized American citizens of Swedish birth, Erik Lindblom and John Brynteson, discovered gold on Anvil Creek. News of the discovery reached the outside world that winter. By 1899, Nome had a population of 10,000 and the area was organized as the Nome mining district. In that year, gold was found in the beach sands for dozens of miles along the coast at Nome, which spurred the stampede to new heights. Thousands more people poured into Nome during the spring of 1900 aboard steamships from the ports of Seattle and San Francisco. By 1900, a tent city on the beaches and on the treeless coast reached , from Cape Rodney to Cape Nome. In June of that year, Nome averaged 1000 newcomers a day.

In 1899, Charles D. Lane founded Wild Goose Mining & Trading Co. His company constructed the Wild Goose Railroad from Nome to Dexter Discovery; it was extended (1906-1908) to the village of Shelton, also known as Lanes Landing. 

Many late-comers tried to "jump" the original claims by filing mining claims covering the same ground. The federal judge for the area ruled the original claims valid, but some of the claim jumpers agreed to share their invalid claims with influential Washington politicians. Alexander McKenzie took an interest in the gold rush and secured the appointment of Arthur Noyes as the federal district judge for the Nome region for the purpose of taking control of gold placer mines in Nome. McKenzie seized mining claims with an unlawfully procured receivership granted by Judge Noyes. McKenzie's claim-jumping scheme was eventually stopped by the federal Ninth Circuit Court of Appeals. However, the episode provided the plot for Rex Beach's best-selling novel The Spoilers (1906), which was made into a stage play, then five times into movies, including two versions starring John Wayne: The Spoilers (co-starring Marlene Dietrich) and North to Alaska (1960, the theme of which mentions Nome.) Wyatt Earp, of Tombstone, Arizona, fame, lived in Nome during gold-rush days - in September 1899, Earp and partner Charles E. Hoxie built the Dexter Saloon, the city's first two-story wooden building and its largest and most luxurious saloon out of more than 60 saloons.

During the period from 1900 to 1909, estimates of Nome's population reached as high as 20,000. The highest recorded population of Nome, in the 1900 United States Census, was 12,488. At this time, Nome was the largest city in the Alaska Territory. Early in this period, the U.S. Army policed the area, and expelled any inhabitant each autumn who did not have shelter (or the resources to pay for shelter) for the harsh winter.

By 1910 Nome's population had fallen to 2,600,  and by 1934, to less than 1,500.

In May 1910, the Industrial Worker, the newspaper of the Industrial Workers of the World (IWW), published a notice from the Nome Miners' Union and Local 240 of the Western Federation of Miners for all unemployed workers to stay away, saying that "All the rich mines are practically worked out."

Fires in 1905 and 1934, as well as violent storms in 1900, 1913, 1945 and 1974, destroyed much of Nome's gold rush-era architecture. The pre-fire "Discovery Saloon" is now a private residence and is being slowly restored as a landmark.

The Black Wolf Squadron, under the command of Capt. St. Clair Streett, landed here on August 23, 1920, after the culmination of a 4527-mile flight from Mitchel Field.  
Noel Wien and Gene Miller based their air services from Nome in June 1927.

Serum run

In 1925, Nome was the destination of the famous Great Race of Mercy, in which dog sleds played a large part in transporting diphtheria antitoxin serum through harsh conditions. In 1973, Nome became the ending point of the 1,049+ mi (1,600+ km) Iditarod Trail Sled Dog Race. The latter part of its route was used in the serum run.

The sled driver of the final leg of the relay was the Norwegian-born Gunnar Kaasen; his lead sled dog was Balto. A statue of Balto by F.G. Roth stands near the Central Park Zoo in Central Park, New York City. Leonhard Seppala ran the penultimate, and longest, leg of the 1925 serum run to Nome. One of his dogs, Togo, is considered the forgotten hero of the Great Race of Mercy; another of his dogs, Fritz, is preserved and on display at the Carrie M. McLain Memorial Museum in Nome.

World War II and later
During World War II, Nome was the last stop on the ferry system for planes flying from the United States to the Soviet Union for the Lend-lease program. The airstrip currently in use was built and troops were stationed there. One "Birchwood" hangar remains and has been transferred to a local group with hopes to restore it. It is not located on the former Marks Air Force Base (now the primary Nome Airport); rather it is a remnant of an auxiliary landing field a mile or so away: "Satellite Field". In the hills north of the city, there were auxiliary facilities associated with the Distant Early Warning system that are visible from the city but are no longer in use.

Total gold production for the Nome district has been at least .

Nome's population decline continued after 1910 although at a fairly slow rate. By 1950 Nome had 1,852 inhabitants. By 1960 the population of Nome had climbed to 2,316. At this point placer gold mining was still the leading economic activity. The local Alaska Native population was involved in ivory carving and the U.S. military had stationed troops in the city also contributing to the local economy.

The Hope Sled Dog Race was run between Anadyr, Russia, and Nome after the fall of the Soviet Union. The race continued for more than a decade, but has not been run since approximately 2004.

Economy

Gold mining has been a major source of employment and revenue for Nome through to the present day. Mining's contribution to the town was estimated at $6 million a year in 1990, before a major increase in the price of gold brought renewed interest to offshore leases (where 1,000,000 ounces of gold were estimated to be in reserve) and a subsequent boom in revenues and employment.

The Discovery Channel has featured 15 seasons of "Bering Sea Gold" concerning offshore efforts to dredge gold both in summer and winter; in the latter season access is gained by making holes in the ice and sending a diver beneath to dredge the sea floor.

Education

Higher education

The University of Alaska Fairbanks operates a regional satellite facility in Nome called the Northwest Campus (formerly known as Northwest Community College).

Public schools
Nome is served by Nome Public Schools and the following public schools attended by over 720 students:
Anvil City Science Academy, a 5–8 charter magnet, is also part of the school district.
Extensions Correspondence School
Nome-Beltz Junior/Senior High School, serves grades 7–12.
Nome Elementary School, serves grades K–6.
Nome Youth Facility.

Private schools
Nome Adventist School, a private school encompassing grades 1 through 9.

Media
Nome's airwaves are filled by the radio stations KNOM (780 AM, 96.1 FM) and KICY (850 AM, 100.3 FM), plus a repeater of Fairbanks' KUAC, K217CK, on 91.3 FM.

Cable television and broadband in Nome is serviced by GCI, which offers all popular cable channels, plus most of Anchorage's television stations. Nome also has three local low-powered stations, K09OW channel 9 and K13UG channel 13 (both carrying programming from ARCS), plus K11TH channel 11 (a 3ABN owned and operated translator).

Nome is home to Alaska's oldest newspaper, the Nome Nugget.

Transportation

Airports

Nome is a regional center of transportation for surrounding villages. There are two state-owned airports:
 Nome Airport – public-use airport located two nautical miles (3.7 km) west of the central business district of Nome, it has two asphalt paved runways: 3/21 measures 5,576 x 150 feet (1,700 × 46 m) and 10/28 is 6,001 x 150 feet (1,829 × 46 m). An $8.5 million airport improvement project is nearing completion.
 Nome City Field – a public-use airport located one nautical mile (1.85 km) north of the central business district of Nome, it has one runway designated 3/21 with a gravel surface measuring 1,950 feet. It is used by general aviation.

Water ports
Nome seaport is used by freight ships and cruise ships, located at 64.5°N and 165.4°W on the southern side of the Seward Peninsula in Norton Sound. The City Dock (south) on the Causeway is equipped with marine headers to handle the community's bulk cargo and fuel deliveries. The Westgold dock handles nearly all of the exported rock/gravel for this region and is the primary location to load/unload heavy equipment. The old entrance along the seawall has been filled in and is no longer navigable (see photos on website). Buoys outline the navigation channel from the outer harbor entrance into the inner harbor. The Nome Small Boat Harbor has a depth of 10 feet (MLLW) and offers protected mooring for recreational and fishing vessels alongside two floating docks. Smaller cargo vessels and landing craft load village freight and fuel at the east, west and south inner harbor sheet pile docks, east beach landing and west barge ramp for delivery in the region.

An addition to the Nome facility in 2005 was a  concrete barge ramp located inside the inner harbor just west of the Snake River entrance. The ramp provides the bulk cargo carriers with a location closer to the causeway to trans-load freight to landing craft and roll equipment on and off barges. This location also has  of uplands to be used for container, vessel and equipment storage.

Surface transportation

Local roads lead to Council, the Kougarok River, and Teller: the Nome-Council, Nome-Taylor, and Nome-Teller Highways, respectively. There are no railroads going to or from Nome. A  road project (Manley Hot Springs–Nome) is being discussed in Alaska. It has been estimated (as of 2010) to cost $2.3 to $2.7 billion, or approximately $5 million per mile.

Healthcare
Local hospitals and medical centers include Norton Sound Regional Hospital and Nome Health Center. The hospital is a qualified acute care facility and medevac service. Long-term care is provided by Quyaana Care Center (a unit of the hospital). Specialized care is available through facilities such as Norton Sound Community Mental Health Center, Turning Point – Saquigvik (transitional living), and XYZ Senior Center. Nome is classified as a large town/Regional Center, it is found in EMS Region 5A in the Norton Sound Region. Emergency Services have limited highway, coastal and airport access. Emergency service is provided by 911 Telephone Service and by Nome Volunteer Ambulance Dept.

In popular culture
The reality television series Bering Sea Gold is set and filmed in Nome.

Nome is referenced in the songs "Marry the Man Today" from the 1950 Frank Loesser/Jo Swerling/Abe Burrows musical Guys and Dolls; in "A Little Brains, A Little Talent" from the 1955 Richard Adler and Jerry Ross musical Damn Yankees; and in  "Ah, Paree!" from Stephen Sondheim's 1971 musical Follies.

Johnny Horton wrote the theme song "North to Alaska" for the film of the same name starring John Wayne. Nome is mentioned twice in the lyrics.

In episode 1 of the 1997 BBC television travel series Full Circle, British actor, comedian, writer and presenter Michael Palin (of Monty Python fame) traveled to Nome and met a goldpanner on the "Golden Sands of Nome".

In the video game Rainbow Six Extraction , Nome appears as one of 12 playable locations.

Films set in Nome
 The Spoilers (1930)
 The Spoilers (1942)
 North to Alaska (1960)
 Balto (1995)
 Balto II: Wolf Quest (2002)
 Balto III: Wings of Change (2004)
 The Fourth Kind (2009)
 Snow Dogs (2002)
 Togo (2019)

Notable people
 Frank E. Kleinschmidt (1871–1949), Arctic explorer, documentary film maker and film correspondent in World War I, lived in Nome with his family around 1905
 Donny Olson (born 1953), represents Nome and surrounding area in the member of Alaska Senate
 Neal Foster (born 1972), represents Nome and surrounding area in the Alaska House of Representatives
 James "Jimmy" Doolittle (1896–1993), U.S. Air Force General; spent part of his youth living in Nome
Dean Phillip Carter (born 1955), convicted spree killer; born in Nome, Alaska

See also
 Nome mining district
 Nome Gold Rush

References

External links

 City of Nome
 University of Washington Libraries Digital Collections – Frank H. Nowell Photographs Photographs documenting scenery, towns, businesses, mining activities, Native Americans, and Eskimos in the vicinity of Nome, Alaska from 1901 to 1909.
 University of Washington Libraries Digital Collections – Wilhelm Hester Photographs 345 photographs c. 1893–1906 of Puget Sound sailing vessels and ships' crews, the Alaska Gold Rush in Nome and vicinity in 1900, images of logging activities in Washington state, and San Francisco's Chinatown.
 University of Washington Libraries Digital Collections – Eric A. Hegg Photographs 736 photographs from 1897 to 1901 documenting the Klondike and Alaska gold rushes, including depictions of frontier life in Skagway and Nome, Alaska and Dawson, Yukon Territory.
 
 
 The Papers of Frances Ross of Nome, Alaska at Dartmouth College Library
 Henriette Hanson Autobiography and Correspondence on her Life in Nome at Dartmouth College Library

 
Cities in Alaska
Cities in Nome Census Area, Alaska
Cities in Unorganized Borough, Alaska
Gold rushes
Klondike Gold Rush
Mining communities in Alaska
Populated coastal places in Alaska on the Pacific Ocean
Populated places established in 1898
Port cities in Alaska
Populated places in the Seward Peninsula
1898 establishments in Alaska